Cyperus harrisii is a species of sedge that is endemic to parts of Jamaica.

The species was first formally described by the botanist Georg Kükenthal in 1926.

See also
 List of Cyperus species

References

harrisii
Flora of Jamaica
Taxa named by Georg Kükenthal
Plants described in 1926
Flora without expected TNC conservation status